Megatech may refer to:

Megatech (Indonesian company), a supercar developer
Megatech International, an American maker of radio-controlled toys
Megatech Software, an American licensor of anime games and eroge
MegaTech, a British video-game magazine
Sega Mega-Tech, a Sega arcade system board